The following lists events that happened during 1988 in Singapore.

Incumbents
President: Wee Kim Wee
Prime Minister: Lee Kuan Yew

Events

January
15 January – Catherine Lim's novel, Or Else, the Lightning God and Other Stories, is selected for the O Level exams conducted internationally in the 1989 and 1990 edition. This marks the first time Singapore literature is selected for examinations.

March
12 March – The MRT system is officially opened, with the opening of a new section from Tiong Bahru to Clementi.

April
April - The first Watsons store opens in Singapore.
22 April – The National Blood Centre is officially opened. The new facilities will have a spacious environment, and can handle 120,000 donors, double the previous premises. The centre can handle national emergencies with mass casualties. In addition, a blood research facility and public health lab will be housed.

June
1 June – Group representation constituencies (GRCs) are introduced.
9 June – The National Skin Centre starts operations.
27 June – The National Pledge is now taken with a right fist on the chest.

July
26 July – The New Paper was launched as a tabloid.

August

8 August – The OUB Centre (present-day One Raffles Place) is officially opened. At 280 metres, it stands as Singapore's tallest building until Guoco Tower's completion in 2016, which stands at 290 metres.
10 August – Kuo Pao Kun's Mama Looking for Her Cat is staged for the first time, making it Singapore's first multilingual play.
13 August – The first Malay Language and Cultural Month is officially opened.
30 August – The Operations Control Centre of the Singapore MRT system is officially opened.

September
3 September – The PAP wins the 1988 General Election.

October
25 October – A major fire took place at the Singapore Refining Company (SRC) refinery in Pulau Merlimau.
29 October – NTUC Pasir Ris Resort is officially opened.

November
5 November – The fourth section of the MRT system is opened from Jurong East to Lakeside.

December
20 December – The fifth section of the MRT is opened from Yishun to Khatib.

Date unknown
The 1988 Singapore Lunar Year of the Dragon 1oz Gold Coin was struck by the Singapore Mint in the year 1988 and belongs to the popular Lunar series of gold bullion coins. Each 24k coin contains 1 troy ounce (31.1035 grams) of gold and is legal tender with a face value of $100
Portek, a medium-sized terminal operator and port equipment engineering provider is founded.
Zoe Tay was crowned the winner in the finals of the inaugural season of the reality television programme Star Search on SBC-8. The finals, which saw her compete against the likes of fellow contestants such as Aileen Tan and Chen Hanwei, was attended by Deputy Prime Minister Goh Chok Tong.

Births
 29 January – Tay Kexin, Singer.
 14 June – Sylvia Ratonel, Singer, runner-up of Singapore Idol (Season 3).
 5 August – Lawrence Wong, Actor.
 14 September – Charlie Goh, Actor.
 3 October – Jeffrey Xu, Actor.
 2 November – Dee Kosh, Radio DJ and YouTube personality.

Deaths
 10 March – Lü Chen Chung, Bible Chinese translator (b. 1898).
3 April – Lee Man Fong, artist (b. 1913).
 22 December – Kouo Shang Wei, pioneer photographer (b. 1924).

References

 
Singapore
Years in Singapore
Singapore